"A Whale of a Tale" is a song from the 1954 film 20,000 Leagues Under the Sea. It is performed by Kirk Douglas, who plays Ned Land. It was written by Al Hoffman and Norman Gimbel. The recording of Kirk Douglas singing the song was very popular at the time.

Part of the song is also sung by a fish in Finding Nemo as he and other similar fish swim in formation, resembling a vessel.

In the film
The song is first heard near the start of the film (the only time when it is heard in its entirety). It starts immediately after a conversation between Ned Land, Conseil, and Pierre Aronnax aboard the ship. Ned takes a guitar and steps onto the deck. The music attracts the attention of several of the crewmen, who listen excitedly with one even participating by singing the line "Held her tenderly" in an extremely low-pitched tone. It is immediately after Ned finishes the song that the Nautilus is finally encountered.

While the full song is only performed once, it is frequently referenced throughout the film. After improvising a guitar out of a turtle shell, Ned is seen twice performing portions of the song: the first he sings part of the chorus to Esmeralda (a seal who resides on the Nautilus) in an effort to hide the fact that he had been stealing treasure, in the second, a drunken Land sings a part of the song he composes to parodize Captain Nemo and the Nautilus's cuisine, while Esmeralda "claps" her "hands" at the rhythm. There is also an instrumental version that is played as background music in several scenes.

References

External links
 
 
 20,000 Leagues Under the Sea at DBCult Film Institute
 20,000 Leagues Under the Sea at Turner Classic Movies

Disney songs
1954 songs
Songs with lyrics by Norman Gimbel
Songs written by Al Hoffman
Music based on works by Jules Verne
Works based on Twenty Thousand Leagues Under the Sea